The Men's Freestyle 97 kg is a competition featured at the 2019 European Wrestling Championships, and was held in Bucharest, Romania on April 8–9, 2019.

Medalists

Results
 Legend
 F — Won by fall
WO — Won by walkover

Final

Top half

Bottom half

Repechage

References

Men's freestyle 97